Pablo Cuevas was the defending champion but decided not to participate.

Rui Machado won the tournament after defeating Éric Prodon 2–6, 7–5, 6–2 in the final. Due to rain, the final was played on Sunday, 18 September 2011 and Monday, 19 September.

Seeds

Draw

Finals

Top half

Bottom half

References
 Main Draw
 Qualifying Draw

Pekao Szczecin Open - Singles
2011 Singles
2011 in Polish sport